Luiz Felipe Ramos Marchi (born 22 March 1997) is a professional footballer who plays as a centre back for La Liga club Real Betis. Born in Brazil and having previously represented his birth nation at youth levels, he plays for the Italy national team.

Club career
In August 2016, Luiz Felipe was signed from Ituano by Serie A club Lazio. However, he was immediately loaned out to sister club Salernitana for the 2016–17 season.

On 4 July 2022, Felipe signed a five-year contract with Real Betis in Spain.

International career 
On 16 March 2019, Luiz Felipe was called up by the head coach of the Italy national under-21 football team, Luigi Di Biagio. Felipe would reject the call as a sign of his loyalty for his native Brazil; Luis Felipe would debut with Brazil national under-23 football team in 2019.

On 24 January 2022, Luiz Felipe accepted a call-up by Italy national football team manager Roberto Mancini to join the Azzurri for a three-day training camp in Coverciano.

On 18 March 2022, Luiz Felipe was selected by Roberto Mancini to join the Italy national football team for a World Cup Qualifier match against North Macedonia national football team on 24 March 2022, making this his first call up to the Italian senior level for a match.

Personal life
Luiz Felipe was born and raised in Colina, São Paulo, his given name being a homage to Brazilian football manager Luiz Felipe Scolari.

He possesses Italian citizenship through jus sanguinis, through an Italian great-grandfather of his, originally from Vicenza but who subsequently settled in Brazil.

Career statistics

Club

Honours
Lazio
Coppa Italia: 2018–19
Supercoppa Italiana: 2017, 2019

References

External links
 
 

1997 births
Living people
Footballers from São Paulo (state)
Italian footballers
Italy international footballers
Brazilian footballers
Brazil youth international footballers
Brazil under-20 international footballers
Brazilian people of Italian descent
Association football central defenders
Serie A players
Serie B players
Campeonato Brasileiro Série D players
Ituano FC players
U.S. Salernitana 1919 players
Real Betis players
Italian expatriate footballers
Brazilian expatriate footballers
Italian expatriate sportspeople in Spain
Brazilian expatriate sportspeople in Spain
Expatriate footballers in Spain
People from Colina, São Paulo